The Rijeka Crnojevića (Serbian Cyrillic: Ријека Црнојевића, lit. "River of Crnojević") is a river in Montenegro, emerging just above and running through the eponymous town, close to the northeastern shores of Lake Skadar.

Its length is 12.3km. The spring of Rijeka Crnojevića is located 2.5km south-west from Rijeka Crnojevića town, under the cave in Obod hill, which is 420m high.

See also 
Crnojević printing house
Rijeka Crnojevića town
Rijeka Crnojevića bridge

References 

Rivers of Montenegro